Terrimonas is a Gram-negative, aerobic and non-motile genus of bacteria from the family of Chitinophagaceae.

References

Chitinophagia
Bacteria genera
Taxa described in 2006